Daniel George Ballard (born 22 September 1999) is a professional footballer who plays for Sunderland as a defender. Born in England, he represents Northern Ireland at international level.

Club career

Arsenal 
Born in Stevenage, Ballard joined the Arsenal Academy at the age of eight. He signed his first professional contract in June 2018.

Loan to Swindon Town 
Ballard moved on loan from Arsenal to Swindon Town in July 2019. He made his debut in a 2–0 win against Scunthorpe United in the League Two on 3 August 2019, coming off the bench in the 88th minute. He then scored his first career goal in an EFL Trophy tie against Chelsea U21s on 6 August 2019. But his loan spell was cut short after just three appearances due to a severe knee injury that required 5 months of recovery time.

Loan to Blackpool 
In October 2020, he moved on loan to Blackpool, signing with the club until January 2021. Ballard made his debut in a 1–0 loss against Charlton in League One on 20 October. On 5 January 2021, it was announced that the loan had been extended to the end of the season. He scored his first goal for the club in a 1–1 draw against Crewe Alexandra on 2 March 2021.

Loan to Millwall
He moved on loan to Millwall on 1 July 2021. He scored his first  goal for the club when he scored against West Bromwich Albion on 11 September 2021 in a 1-1 draw.

Sunderland
On 30 June 2022, Ballard joined newly promoted Championship club Sunderland for an undisclosed fee, signing a three-year contract.

International career
Born in England, Ballard qualifies to represent Northern Ireland as his mother was born there.

He has represented Northern Ireland at Under-18 and Under-21 levels. He was called up to the senior team for the first time in March 2019. He made his senior debut in a 1–1 draw against Romania in a Nations League game in September 2020.

Career statistics

Club

International

Scores and results list Northern Ireland's goal tally first, score column indicates score after each Ballard goal.

References

1999 births
Living people
People from Stevenage
Association football defenders
Association footballers from Northern Ireland
Northern Ireland international footballers
Northern Ireland youth international footballers
Northern Ireland under-21 international footballers
English footballers
English people of Northern Ireland descent
Arsenal F.C. players
Swindon Town F.C. players
Blackpool F.C. players
Millwall F.C. players
Sunderland A.F.C. players
English Football League players